Gilbert Gress (born 17 December 1941) is a French football coach and a former player. He was the mentor of Arsène Wenger.

Club career 
Gress was born in Strasbourg. He began his professional football career in the city of his birth with RC Strasbourg, where the fans soon nicknamed him the "angel of la Meinau" (L'ange de la Meinau; Engel von der Meinau, Meinau is the stadium of the club). Briefly after first playing for Strasbourg (May 1960) the team were relegated to the second division, but returned after one year to Division 1, where Gress played until 1966 and his departure to VfB Stuttgart. Strasbourg were at the time only in mid-table of the division, but won the 1966 Coupe de France.

During his time in Germany, he was called up for the first time to the France national team. During the 1970–71 season, Gress returned to his homeland and joined Olympique de Marseille, then two-time French champions. From 1973 to 1975, he came back to RC Strasbourg, before moving for one year to Neuchâtel Xamax in Switzerland and ending his playing career in 1977.

Gress completed 290 matches (201 for Strasbourg, 89 for Marseille) in France and scored 28 goals; in the federal league he came on 149 times.

International career 
In 1966, after having won the Coupe de France, Gress was not called up to the 1966 FIFA World Cup in England by France national team coach Henri Guérin because Gress refused to shorten his long hair. Under the new coach Louis Dugauguez, Gress was first called up on 27 September 1967 (a 5–1 defeat against Germany in Berlin). Altogether he played only three times in the France national team (1967, 1968 and 1971) and did not score any goals.

Managerial career 
Since 1977, Gress has worked as a football manager, receiving his first job in his home town at RC Strasbourg, where he had won the 1979 French championship, and where he returned again in 1991 for three years. His popularity is expressed also in the establishment of a Gilbert Gress Fanclub. In addition, he worked in Belgium, Austria and in Switzerland, where in 16 years (including twelve with Neuchâtel Xamax) he won two national championships and the cup. In 1998, he was appointed Swiss national football coach. A debate preceded his resignation over his wages as a national coach. In the meantime, Gress had also accepted Swiss nationality. In June 2009, he was named RC Strasbourg manager, his third stint as manager of the club. and was released after only two games on 12 August 2009.

Honours

Player
Strasbourg
 Coupe de France: 1965–66

Marseille
 Ligue 1: 1970–71, 1971–72

Manager 
Strasbourg
 Ligue 1: 1978–79

Neuchâtel Xamax
 Swiss Super League: 1986–87, 1987–88
 Swiss Super Cup: 1987, 1988

FC Zürich
 Swiss Cup: 1999–2000

References

External links 
 
 

1941 births
Living people
France international footballers
French football managers
French footballers
French people of German descent
Footballers from Strasbourg
Neuchâtel Xamax FCS players
Olympique de Marseille players
VfB Stuttgart players
Ligue 1 players
Bundesliga players
RC Strasbourg Alsace players
RC Strasbourg Alsace managers
Neuchâtel Xamax FCS managers
Servette FC managers
Switzerland national football team managers
FC Metz managers
SK Sturm Graz managers
FC Zürich managers
FC Sion managers
FC Aarau managers
Ligue 1 managers
Club Brugge KV head coaches
Association football midfielders
Association football forwards
French expatriate footballers
French expatriate football managers
French expatriate sportspeople in West Germany
Expatriate footballers in West Germany
French expatriate sportspeople in Switzerland
Expatriate footballers in Switzerland
Expatriate football managers in Switzerland
Expatriate football managers in Belgium
French expatriate sportspeople in Belgium